Lieuwe Westra (11 September 1982 – 14 January 2023) was a Dutch professional racing cyclist who rode professionally between 2006 and 2016 for the KrolStonE Continental Team,  and  teams.

Life and career
Born in Mûnein, Westra finished second at the 2012 Paris–Nice, a UCI World Tour race; he also won the queen stage to Mende. This particular stage finished atop the Côte de la Croix-Neuve–Montée Laurent Jalabert – a  climb at an average gradient of 10.1%. He attacked inside the final kilometer and the lead group piloted by race leader Bradley Wiggins could not reel him in. He freewheeled over the finishing line, sparking speculation that he could have put on the leader's jersey had he pursued his effort, since the win put him 6 seconds in arrears of Wiggins. He would finish Paris-Nice 8 seconds down on the Briton in the general classification. In August, Westra won the overall classification of the 2012 Danmark Rundt, a six-stage race held in Denmark. He won the event's individual time trial, helping him seal the victory as it netted him the leader's jersey, which he would not relinquish. Ramūnas Navardauskas of the  squad finished second with a deficit of 10 seconds. Francisco Mancebo joined him in his bid for victory, the pair cooperated and Westra won the two-man sprint.

After five years with the  team, Westra joined  on a two-year contract, for the 2014 and 2015 seasons.

On Sunday 8 January 2017, Westra announced his retirement via his Facebook page. He wrote "Today I have decided to stop racing. I cannot afford to continue. Thanks to A Boskamp and K Snijder! Ok I stop but go now and I have time to solve these issues briefly Thanks to cycling world ciaoooo westra". This post was subsequently deleted, however the next day the retirement was confirmed via the Twitter account for the  team.

Westra died on 14 January 2023, at the age of 40.

Career achievements

Major results

2007
 4th Overall OZ Wielerweekend
1st Stage 2 (ITT)
2008
 1st Stage 2 Tour Alsace
 2nd Overall Olympia's Tour
 3rd Duo Normand (with Jos Pronk)
 3rd Schaal Sels-Merksem
 4th Omloop der Kempen
 5th Hel van het Mergelland
 6th Overall Tour du Loir-et-Cher
 6th Ronde van Overijssel
 9th Grote Prijs Jef Scherens
2009
 1st  Overall Tour de Picardie
1st Stage 1
 1st Arno Wallaard Memorial
 6th Ronde van het Groene Hart
2010
 3rd Time trial, National Road Championships
 3rd Chrono des Nations
 4th Duo Normand (with Jens Mouris)
 5th Overall Three Days of De Panne
 7th Profronde van Fryslan
2011
 1st Classic Loire Atlantique
 1st Prologue Tour of Belgium
 2nd Overall Three Days of De Panne
1st  Mountains classification
 3rd Overall Volta ao Algarve
 8th Time trial, UCI Road World Championships
 8th Chrono des Nations
2012
 1st  Time trial, National Road Championships
 1st  Overall Danmark Rundt
1st Stage 5 (ITT)
 2nd Overall Paris–Nice
1st Stage 5
 2nd Overall Three Days of De Panne
 2nd Overall Tour of Belgium
2013
 1st  Time trial, National Road Championships
 1st Stage 1 Tour of California
 3rd Overall Volta ao Algarve
 5th Overall Three Days of De Panne
 8th Overall Étoile de Bessèges
 8th Overall Paris–Nice
2014
 1st Stage 7 Volta a Catalunya
 1st Stage 7 Critérium du Dauphiné
  Combativity award Stage 5 Tour de France
2016
 1st  Overall Three Days of De Panne

Grand Tour general classification results timeline

See also
 List of Dutch Olympic cyclists

References

External links

Lieuwe Westra's Profile on Cycling Base
 

1982 births
2023 deaths
Dutch male cyclists
Road racing cyclists
People from Tytsjerksteradiel
Cyclists at the 2012 Summer Olympics
Olympic cyclists of the Netherlands
Danmark Rundt winners
Dutch cycling time trial champions
UCI Road World Championships cyclists for the Netherlands
Cyclists from Friesland